Peschany or Peschanaya may refer to:
Peschanaya, Irkutsk Oblast, a rural locality in Russia
Peschany, Murmansk Oblast, a rural locality in Russia
Peschany Island, an island in the Laptev Sea
Qum Island or Peschany Island, an island in the Caspian Sea
Peschanaya (river), a left tributary of the Ob River, Russia
Cape Peschany or Cape Unslicht, a cape in Severnaya Zemlya
Cape Peschany (Caspian Sea), a cape in Kazakhstan

See also
Peschany (rural locality) (Peschanaya, Peschanoye), a list of rural localities in Russia